The 2010 ADAC Rallye Deutschland was the 28th Rallye Deutschland and the ninth round of the 2010 World Rally Championship season. The rally took place between 20 and 22 August in Trier. It was the first of two WRC rounds where all WRC support series competed in the same round. The rally was the fourth round of the Junior World Rally Championship, the sixth round of the Production World Rally Championship and the seventh round of the Super 2000 World Rally Championship.

Sébastien Loeb claimed his 59th WRC victory to move 58 points clear in the championship with a maximum of 100 points still available in the remaining four events. The rally also saw the only overall stage win for F1 driver Kimi Räikkönen.

Results

Event standings

Special stages

Standings after the rally

Drivers' Championship standings

Manufacturers' Championship standings

References

External links

 Results at eWRC.com

Deutschland
Rallye Deutschland
Rallye Deutschland